27th National Board of Review Awards
December 20, 1955
The 27th National Board of Review Awards were announced on December 20, 1955.

Top Ten Films 
Marty
East of Eden
Mister Roberts
Bad Day at Black Rock
Summertime
The Rose Tattoo
A Man Called Peter
Not as a Stranger
Picnic
The African Lion

Top Foreign Films 
The Prisoner
The Great Adventure
The Divided Heart
Diabolique
The End of the Affair

Winners 
Best Film: Marty
Best Foreign Film: The Prisoner
Best Actor: Ernest Borgnine (Marty)
Best Actress: Anna Magnani (The Rose Tattoo)
Best Supporting Actor: Charles Bickford (Not as a Stranger)
Best Supporting Actress: Marjorie Rambeau (A Man Called Peter, The View from Pompey's Head)
Best Director: William Wyler (The Desperate Hours)

External links 
 National Board of Review of Motion Pictures :: Awards for 1955

1955
1955 film awards
1955 in American cinema
1955 awards in the United States
December 1955 events in the United States